Christopher Loffredo Hayes (born February 28, 1979) is an American political commentator, television news anchor, activist, and author. Hayes hosts All In with Chris Hayes, a weekday news and opinion television show on MSNBC. Hayes also hosts a weekly MSNBC podcast, Why Is This Happening? Hayes formerly hosted a weekend MSNBC show, Up with Chris Hayes. He is an editor-at-large of The Nation magazine.

Early life 
Hayes was born in the Norwood neighborhood of Riverdale in  the Bronx, one of three sons of Roger and Geri Hayes. His mother is of Italian descent and his father is of Irish Catholic ancestry. His father moved to New York from Chicago while studying at a Jesuit seminary, and began community organizing in the Bronx. Roger Hayes spent several years leading community organizing at the Community Service Society of New York and works as an assistant commissioner for the NYC Department of Health. Hayes's mother was a school teacher and works for the NYC Department of Education. Hayes was raised Catholic,  but stopped attending services in college and does not consider himself to be religious.

He is a childhood friend and schoolmate of comedian Desus Nice. Hayes attended New York City's prestigious Hunter College High School; his classmates included Immortal Technique and Lin-Manuel Miranda. Hayes directed the latter in Miranda's first musical. 

Hayes attended Brown University majoring in philosophy and graduated with a Bachelor of Arts degree in 2001. Speaking of "intellectual formation" at Brown with Ezra Klein, Hayes stated, "I was a philosophy major, but I was very much in this sort of analytic school. But the intellectual culture of the place I was with and the people I was with was very influenced by postmodern critique, by Foucault... particularly." At Brown Hayes met his future wife, Kate A. Shaw.

Journalism career

Print
Beginning in August 2001, for four years Hayes was a contributor to the independent weekly newspaper Chicago Reader, where he covered local and national politics. In late 2003, he began a four-year stint at In These Times, a labor-focused monthly magazine based in Chicago where he was a senior editor.

From 2005 to 2006, Hayes was a Schumann Center Writing Fellow at In These Times. From 2006 through 2007, Hayes was a Puffin Foundation Writing Fellow at The Nation Institute, and a contributing writer for The Nation. On November 1, 2007, The Nation named him its Washington, D.C. editor, succeeding David Corn.

Hayes wrote extensively on issues central to the liberal community, including what ails the Democratic Party in the post-9/11 era and how the labor movement is changing. He also reported on progressive activists' work to resuscitate the "public option" during the 2009–2010 health care fight when many political insiders wrote it off as dead.

Hayes was an adjunct professor of English at St. Augustine College in Chicago and a Bernard L. Schwartz fellow at New America Foundation from 2008 to 2010.

Cable news
Hayes guest-hosted The Rachel Maddow Show in July 2010 while Maddow was traveling in Afghanistan and later often filled in for Maddow when she was absent. Hayes has also hosted other MSNBC shows such as The Ed Show, Countdown With Keith Olbermann, and The Last Word with Lawrence O'Donnell.

On November 5, 2010, MSNBC announced that Hayes would be filling in for Keith Olbermann during Olbermann's suspension. However, the network later backtracked after finding out that Hayes had also made political contributions—the issue over which Olbermann was being suspended.

Hayes credits Maddow with his becoming a host at MSNBC, saying, "I absolutely would not be doing this if it weren't for her."

Chris Hayes is also the most frequent guest on Late Night with Seth Meyers.

Up with Chris Hayes 
On August 1, 2011, MSNBC announced that Hayes would host a two-hour morning show on Saturdays and Sundays, each going into depth on current issues. The first airing of Up with Chris Hayes was September 17, 2011, and featured a live interview with Nancy Pelosi.

On May 27, 2012, Memorial Day Weekend, Hayes made comments on air regarding the use of the word "heroism" as applied to American servicemen killed in action, stating, "I feel uncomfortable about the word because it seems to me that it is so rhetorically proximate to justifications for more war. And I don't want to obviously desecrate or disrespect the memory of anyone that's fallen, and obviously there are individual circumstances in which there is genuine, tremendous heroism, you know, hail of gunfire, rescuing fellow soldiers, and things like that. But it seems to me that we marshal this word in a way that is problematic. But maybe I'm wrong about that." His remark generated widespread controversy. Hayes initially defended his comment by urging people to listen to what he had actually said. Nonetheless, he apologized on his blog. Furthermore, on his June 2, 2012, show, he devoted a discussion to his comments and the disconnect between civilians and the military.

All In with Chris Hayes 
On March 14, 2013, MSNBC announced that Hayes would take over the time slot formerly hosted by Ed Schultz, who would move to the weekends. At 34-years old, he became the youngest host of a prime-time show on any of the country's major cable news channels.

According to The New York Times, the change was made in the hopes that MSNBC can win a wider audience than it did with Schultz. Hayes was said to transition better to The Rachel Maddow Show because he is seen as just as policy-oriented as Maddow. "Chris has done an amazing job creating a franchise on weekend mornings," said Phil Griffin, the president of MSNBC. "He's an extraordinary talent and has made a strong connection with our audience."

All In with Chris Hayes, Hayes's first prime-time show, premiered Monday, April 1, 2013.

The show won an Emmy in 2015 and again in 2018.

Podcasts 
In May 2018, Hayes launched a weekly podcast called Why Is This Happening?, featuring interviews with political figures, activists, journalists, writers, and academics. The podcast's first live episode was recorded in November 2018, at Congregation Beth Elohim, in Brooklyn, New York, with author Ta-Nehisi Coates. Hayes' second live episode, held on February 24, 2019, featured an interview with Georgia politician and activist Stacey Abrams.

Views

Press freedom
Hayes criticized the United States government's decision to charge WikiLeaks founder Julian Assange under the Espionage Act of 1917 for his role in the 2010 publication of a trove of Iraq War documents and diplomatic cables leaked by Army intelligence analyst Chelsea Manning. Hayes tweeted: "The Espionage indictment of Assange for publishing is an extremely dangerous, frontal attack on the free press. Bad, bad, bad."

Books 
Hayes's first book, Twilight of the Elites: America After Meritocracy was published by Crown Publishing Group in June 2012. A review in The Atlantic called it "provocative" and "thoughtful," but faulted its policy suggestions as less satisfying. Kirkus Reviews called it "forcefully written" and "provocative." Aaron Swartz described the book as "compellingly readable, impossibly erudite, and—most stunningly of all—correct."

Hayes' second book, A Colony in a Nation (about the U.S. criminal justice system), was published by W. W. Norton in March 2017.

Book festivals
Hayes participated in the 2017 Brooklyn Book Festival (BKBF).

In April 2017, he was a featured author at the L.A. Times Festival of Books, which took place at the campus of USC.

Personal life 

On July 14, 2007, Hayes married his college sweetheart Kate Shaw, currently a professor of law at the Yeshiva University Benjamin N. Cardozo School of Law, and Supreme Court contributor for ABC News. Shaw had previously clerked for U.S. Supreme Court Justice John Paul Stevens. Shaw and Hayes met while attending Brown together. His father-in-law is veteran Chicago reporter Andy Shaw. Hayes and Shaw resided in Washington, D.C., until they moved to New York City, where All in With Chris Hayes is produced. They have three children.

Hayes' brother Luke worked on Barack Obama's 2008 and 2012 presidential campaigns, and served as the campaign manager for U.S. Congressman Jamaal Bowman in 2020.

, Hayes is a member of the Democratic Party.

See also

 New Yorkers in journalism

References

External links

 Chris Hayes personal site
 All In with Chris Hayes MSNBC site
 Chris Hayes bio on MSNBC
 

1979 births
21st-century American journalists
21st-century American writers
American male journalists
American people of Irish descent
American political commentators
American television hosts
American writers of Italian descent
Brown University alumni
Chicago Reader people
Hunter College High School alumni
Journalists from Illinois
Journalists from New York City
Living people
MSNBC people
New America (organization)
New York (state) Democrats
People from the Bronx
The Nation (U.S. magazine) people
Writers from Brooklyn
Writers from Chicago
Liberalism in the United States